The Oz Academy Tag Team Championship is a professional wrestling tag team championship owned by the Oz Academy professional wrestling promotion. The championship was introduced on July 13, 2008, when Carlos Amano and Dynamite Kansai defeated Chikayo Nagashima and Sonoko Kato in the finals of a tournament to become the inaugural champions.

Like most professional wrestling championships, the title is won as a result of a scripted match. There have been a total of thirty-seven reigns shared among twenty-nine teams and thirty-two wrestlers. Ryo Mizunami and Sonoko Kato are the current champions in their first reign as a team, while it's the sixth reign individually for Kato and the first for Mizunami.

Reigns 
Carlos Amano and Dynamite Kansai were the first champions in the title's history. SonChika (Chikayo Nagashima and Sonoko Kato) and Jungle Jack 21 (Hiroyo Matsumoto and Tomoka Nakagawa) share the record for most reigns as a team, with three. The former's second reign holds the record for the shortest reign in the title's history, at 14 days, while the latter's third reign holds the record for the longest reign, at 385 days. Hiroyo Matsumoto and Mayumi Ozaki holds the record for most reigns individually, with six.

Title history

Combined reigns 

By team

By wrestler

See also 
 Goddess of Stardom Championship
 International Ribbon Tag Team Championship
 JWP Tag Team Championship
 Wave Tag Team Championship
Women's World Tag Team Championship

References

External links 
 Oz Academy's official website
 OZ Academy Tag Team Championship history at Wrestling-Titles.com

Oz Academy championships
Women's professional wrestling tag team championships